The 1930–31 Washington State Cougars men's basketball team represented Washington State College for the  college basketball season. Led by third-year head coach Jack Friel, the Cougars were members of the Pacific Coast Conference and played their home games on campus at WSC Gymnasium in Pullman, Washington.

References

External links
Sports Reference – Washington State Cougars: 1930–31 basketball season

Washington State Cougars men's basketball seasons
Washington State Cougars
Washington State
Washington State